Romana Župan (born 22 May 1987) is a Croatian sports sailor.

She was born in Zadar, Croatia. At the 2012 Summer Olympics, she competed in the women's 470 class where, alongside crewmate Enia Ninčević, she finished 17th.

References

1987 births
Living people
Croatian female sailors (sport)
Olympic sailors of Croatia
Sailors at the 2012 Summer Olympics – 470
Mediterranean Games silver medalists for Croatia
Competitors at the 2013 Mediterranean Games
Mediterranean Games medalists in sailing